A diameter is a line segment passing through the center of a circle or sphere with both its endpoints on the circle or sphere.

Diameter may also refer to:

 Diameter (graph theory), the longest distance between 2 points on a graph
 Diameter (protocol), a computer protocol
 Diameter (group theory), the measure of a finite group's complexity
 The diameters of a screwthread
 Diameter of a set, the supremum (i.e. "maximum") of the distances between any two points of a subset of a metric space

See also 
 Demeter (disambiguation)